There were four cycling events at the 2007 Pan American Games: road cycling, track cycling, mountain bike and BMX racing.

Road cycling

Men's events

Women's events

Track cycling

Men's events

Women's events

Mountain bike

BMX

Medal table

References
 Results

See also
2007 in track cycling

Pan American Games
2007
Events at the 2007 Pan American Games
2007 in road cycling
2007 in track cycling
2007 in BMX
2007 in mountain biking
International cycle races hosted by Brazil

no:Sykling under Panamerikanske leker 1955